Nikola Birač (born 9 August 1986) is a Serbian professional basketball coach who is an assistant coach for Budućnost of the ABA League and the Montenegrin League.

Coaching career 
Birač worked as an assistant coach for Crvena zvezda under Svetislav Pešić, Vlada Vukoičić, and Dejan Radonjić between 2011 and 2017.

In 2017, Birač was an assistant coach for Turkish club Yeşilgiresun under Mihailo Uvalin. In 2018, he filed and won a claim against Yeşilgiresun for outstanding salaries, accommodation and travel expenses.

In August 2019, Birač was named an assistant coach for Dynamic VIP PAY under Miro Alilović.

In December 2020, Birač was named an assistant coach for Crvena zvezda under Dejan Radonjić. He left the Zvezda after the Radonjić's departure in July 2022.

Career achievements and awards
As assistant coach
 Serbian League champion: 5  (with Crvena zvezda: 2014–15, 2015–16, 2016–17, 2020–21, 2021–22)
 Adriatic League champion: 5  (with Crvena zvezda: 2014–15, 2015–16, 2016–17, 2020–21, 2021–22)
 Serbian Cup winner: 6  (with Crvena zvezda: 2012–13, 2013–14, 2014–15, 2016–17, 2020–21, 2021–22)
 Magenta Sport Cup winner: 1 (with Crvena zvezda: 2021)

References

External links
 Coach Profile at eurobasket.com

1986 births
Living people
KK Crvena zvezda assistant coaches
Serbian expatriate basketball people in Montenegro
Serbian expatriate basketball people in Turkey
Serbian men's basketball coaches
Sportspeople from Belgrade
University of Belgrade Faculty of Economics alumni